James Harold Thompson (born November 10, 1944) was an American politician in the state of Florida.

Thompson was born in Mobile, Alabama. He moved to Florida in 1945 with his family, and later attended Florida State University, earning a Juris Doctor degree. He is an attorney. He served in the Florida House of Representatives in the 10th district from November 5, 1974 to November 2, 1982 and the 8th district from November 2, 1982 to November 4, 1986. From 1985 to 1986, he was Speaker of the Florida House of Representatives.

References

Living people
1944 births
Politicians from Mobile, Alabama
Speakers of the Florida House of Representatives
Democratic Party members of the Florida House of Representatives
Lawyers from Mobile, Alabama
20th-century American politicians